Albert J. Lindberg Airport  is a town owned public use airport located 2 miles (3 km) south of the central business district of Clark Township, a town in Mackinac County, Michigan, United States.

Although most U.S. airports use the same three-letter location identifier for the FAA and IATA, this airport is assigned 5Y1 by the FAA but has no designation from the IATA.

Facilities and aircraft 
Albert J. Lindberg Airport covers an area of 160 acres (65 ha) at an elevation of 760 feet (232 m) above mean sea level. It has one runway: 9/27 is 3,700 by 60 feet (1,128 x 18 m) with an asphalt surface.

The airport has a fixed-base operator that sells both 100LL and JetA aviation fuel.

For the 12-month period ending December 31, 2018, the airport had 250 aircraft operations, an average of 21 per month: all general aviation.
For  the  same time period, there were 7 aircraft based at the field, all single-engine airplanes.

Accidents and incidents 

 On April 2, 2020, a small aircraft crashed at the airport after experiencing a strong crosswind while landing. The plane impacted a snow bank and came to rest in a nose-forward attitude.

See also
 List of airports in Michigan
 List of airports in Michigan's Upper Peninsula

References

External links 
 Albert J Lindberg Airport from the Michigan DOT Airport Directory
 

Airports in Michigan
Buildings and structures in Mackinac County, Michigan
Airports in the Upper Peninsula of Michigan